Vidyasagar (15 April 1932 – 19 February 2022), known by his stage name Rajesh, was an Indian actor who appeared in Kannada films. Known as 'Kala Thapaswi', Rajesh was an ardent fan of literature. He appeared in many films as the lead in the late 1960s and early 1970s, and later on gravitated to strong character roles. He is the father of film actress Aasha Rani who acted in Rathasapthami with Shivrajkumar and the father-in-law of popular Kannada and Tamil actor Arjun Sarja. 

Rajesh has acted in over 150 films. "Kalathapasvi Rajesh Athmakathe" is the biography of Rajesh. In 2014, he was awarded the Dr. Rajkumar Cultural Endowment Award by the Kannada Sahitya Parishat. He lived in Vidyaranyapura, Bangalore.

Early life
Rajesh was born as Vidyasagar in Bangalore, India, on 15 April 1932, to a Kannada Kuruba Gowda family. He grew up watching then stars such as Thyagaraja Bhagavatar, Rajakumari and T. R. Mahalingam. He had developed interest in theatre from his childhood and joined Sudarshana Nataka Mandali without his parents' knowledge. In the name of tuition he was going for practice and the first role he got was ‘Sri Rama’. From pamphlets, his parents discovered that he had joined the theatre troupe.

Career

Early career
Rajesh initially worked as a typist in government offices. He was doing what Chi Udayashanker famous cinema writer was doing in the office. In the ledger books he would keep famous novels and read them. Chi Udayashanker was sent out from office for that. Even Rajesh had faced a similar situation. Later he formed the Shakti Nataka Mandali, staging many popular plays. One fine day he got up from the sleet and started writing a play on unemployment. It was titled ‘Nirudyogi Baalu’. The play he directed later. It got good appreciation. ‘Badavana Baalu’ was his next and it continued like that. 
Playwright Basheer asked him to act in plays and he was in Visha Sarpa, Nandadeepa, Chandrodaya and Kittur Rani Chennamma. Thackeray role was well received.

His theatre performances eventually progressed to film roles. It was veteran director Hunsur Krishnamurthy who introduced Vidyasagar in Veera Sankalpa. He applied for 15 days leave from his job and went to Madras. While acting in this film he received an offer for ‘Sri Ramanjeneya Yuddha’. Rajakumar was Sri Rama and he was Bharatha, Udayakumar was Anjaneya. It was a successful film. While acting in his second film he received another offer from B R Panthulu for ‘Gange Gowri’. Rajkumar was ‘Shiva’ and he was ‘Maha Vishnu’. Rajesh then rejected the offer to star in ‘Jeevana Tharanga’ because of internal politicking. Rajesh did not act for two years after that. When Narayan Seth from Mumbai contacted him and took him to CV Shivashanker, he returned to acting. That was a new beginning. It was the film's producer B.S. Narayan, Late Shri Suryanarayan Rao & Late J N Shetty who rechristened Vidyasagar as Rajesh and the film was ‘Namma Ooru'. 

Namma Ooru (1968) directed by C. V. Shivashankar became runaway hit. The song "Hogadhiri Sodarare" from the film made him popular. The then Finance Minister Ramakrishna Hegde gave the film 100 per cent tax exemption. After that, Rajesh was flooded with offers. He had recently acted in Nanna Gopala, a children's film directed by Lakshman.
Though he started a ittle late compared to Udaykumar, Rajkumar and Kalyan Kumar, they were all contemporaries. In that competitive period, Rajesh stood strong for his terrific performance on the silver screen in Kannada cinema. He was not only good in acting but also in singing. He has also acted in Devara Makkalu, Prathidwani, Kranthiveera and Bidugade with Dr. Raj Kumar.

Later career
In ‘Devara Gudi’ he costarred with Vishnuvardhana in an important role. After that he had more hits like Devara Duddu, Badhu Bangaravaythu, Beluvaladha Madilalli, Mugiyadha Kathe in the 1970s and Kaliyuga, Pitamaha and Satyanarayana Pooja Phale in the 1980s.

He was of the notion that, in the 1950s onwards Honnappa Bhagavatar, Rajkumar, Udayakumar, Kalyankumar, B.R. Pantulu, K. S. Ashwath, Narasimha Raju, Balakrishna, Iyer, B. Saroja Devi, Leelavathi, Pandari Bai, MV Rajamma, Mynavathi, Vandhana, Kalpana, Jayanthi, Bharathi enriched the film industry. But Rajesh regretted that Kannada films produced in the recent times have lost their credence in the absence of good story and social commitment. The yesteryear star said "Those films had a message for the society besides providing healthy entertainment. But the films that have come after 1980 lack social commitment and are of cheap taste. The technological development and huge money being spent on films have not been used by filmmakers for the good of the society."

Personal life and death
Rajesh died at a private hospital in Bangalore, on 19 February 2022, at the age of 89. He suffered from breathing complications.

Awards
Rajesh was conferred the honorary doctorate by the Karnataka University in the year 2012.

Partial filmography

:Refer: Kannada films of the 1960s, Kannada films of the 1970s

References

External links 
 

1932 births
2022 deaths
20th-century Indian male actors
20th-century Indian male singers
20th-century Indian singers
Indian male film actors
Male actors in Kannada cinema
Male actors from Bangalore
Kannada male actors
Indian male playback singers
Kannada playback singers
Singers from Bangalore
Film musicians from Karnataka